The Summer is Gone is a 2016 Chinese drama film written and directed by Zhang Dalei. At the 2016 Golden Horse Awards the film won 3 awards for Best Feature Film, Best New Performer and the FIPRESCI Prize. It is scheduled for release in China on 24 March 2017. The film won the Grand Prix award at the 24th Beijing College Student Film Festival.

Plot

The film follows the story of a 12-year-old boy (Kong Weiyi) living in China's Inner Mongolia Autonomous Region.

Cast
Kong Weiyi as Zhang Xiaolei
Zhang Chen as Dad
Guo Yanyuan as Mom

Awards and nominations

References

External links
 

Films set in Inner Mongolia
Chinese drama films
2016 drama films
2016 directorial debut films
Best Feature Film Golden Horse Award winners
Chinese black-and-white films